5th Republic is a 2005 South Korean drama television series that aired on MBC from April 23 to September 1, 2005, on Saturdays and Sundays at 21:40 (KST) for 41 episodes. It depicts the period of the Fifth Republic of South Korea, during which President Chun Doo-hwan was the dictator from 1981 to 1988, from his rise to power through a military coup to his downfall after a series of democratic movements, such as the Gwangju uprising and the June Democratic Uprising. The Fifth Republic was a politically and socially turbulent era in the country's history, which generated controversy for the drama series.

Synopsis
Seventeen former politicians and key aides of Chun's (including Chang Se-dong, his former chief-of-staff; Hur Hwa-pyong, lawmaker; Jeong Ho-yong, former Army Chief of Staff; and Lee Hak-bong, former vice director of the Korea Central Intelligence Agency) attempted to halt the drama in pre-production, and failing that, sent a statement to the producers with claims of historical distortion and threatened legal action unless the script was changed. The production refused, with producer-director Im Tae-woo saying that they tried their best to maintain objectivity by basing their script on historical records and information that they collected for three years, such as Supreme Court rulings, and other hearing documents and news reports at that time.

Cast
Lee Deok-hwa as Chun Doo-hwan
Seo In-seok as Roh Tae-woo
Kim Young-ran as Rhee Soon-ja
Song Ok-sook as Kim Ok-suk
Hong Hak-pyo as Chang Se-dong
Yoon Seung-won as Jeong Ho-yong
Lee Jae-yong as Lee Hak-bong
Kim Sung-kyum as Choi Kyu-ha
Im Dong-jin as Kim Dae-jung
Kim Yong-gun as Kim Young-sam
Lee Jung-gil as Kim Jong-pil
Won Jong-rye as Park Young-ok
Yeon Woon-kyung as Lee Hui-ho
Hyun Sook-hee as Son Myung-soon
Lee Jin-woo as Hur Hwa-pyong
Cha Kwang-soo as Huh Sam-soo
Lee Hee-do as Huh Moon-do
Jeon Su-ji as Park Geun-young
Jung Han-heon as Kwon Jung-dal
Kim Hyung-il as Kim Jae-gyu
Jung Ho-keun as Cha Ji-chul
Kim Sung-joon as Park Heung-ju
Kim Hyuk as Park Seon-ho
Jo Mi-na as Shin Jae-soon
Shin Dong-mi as Shim Soo-bong
Lee Chang-hwan as Park Chung-hee
Park In-hwan as Jeong Seung-hwa
Kim Ki-hyeon as Jang Tae-wan
Yang Mi-kyung as Yuk Young-soo
Na Sung-kyoon as Kim Gye-won
Moon Hoe-won as Hwang Young-shi
Lee Seung-hyung as Park Chul-un
 Lee Han-wi as Kim Yong-nam
Lee Ki-young as Choi Se-chang
Go Jung-min as Park Geun-hye
Kim Nam-gil as Park Ji-man

References

External links
  

Korean-language television shows
2005 South Korean television series debuts
2005 South Korean television series endings
MBC TV television dramas
South Korean political television series
South Korean military television series
Works about coups d'état